Alice Nkom (born January 14, 1945) is a Cameroonian lawyer, well known for her advocacy towards decriminalization of homosexuality in Cameroon. She studied law in Toulouse and has been a lawyer in Douala since 1969. At the age of 24, she was the first black French-speaking woman called to the bar in Cameroon.

Her work involved the defence in a variety of situations, including young victims of police violence, but she became best known for her defence of people accused of homosexuality (criminalized in Cameroon). In 2003 she founded ADEFHO: the Association for the Defence of Homosexuality. For her achievements in the fight against an "anti-gay crackdown", she was listed number two in The New Yorker's "The Eight Most Fascinating Africans of 2012" ranking.

Nkom's most famous case was in 2005 when she defended a group of men who were arrested during a raid of a gay bar in the Cameroon capital city. The men were in prison for a year however in 2006 the UN's working group on Arbitrary Detention reviewed the case and criticized Cameroon for arresting the men because of their sexuality. As well the UN labeled the anti-sexuality offenses in Cameroon's Penal Code as a violation of the international human rights laws.

In January 2011, she was threatened with arrest by a representative of Cameroon's Ministry of Communication after ADEFHO  was awarded a €300,000 grant by the European Union. Later that year, she represented Jean-Claude Roger Mbede, a man imprisoned for three years for "homosexuality and attempted homosexuality" following a series of SMS messages to a male acquaintance, and who was named a prisoner of conscience by Amnesty International.

In 2006 and 2013, she was a keynote speaker at the Human Rights conferences that took place in conjunction with the OutGames, in Montréal, Canada and Antwerp, Belgium, respectively. In March 2014, Alice Nkom was awarded with the "7. Menschenrechtspreis" (7th Human Rights Award) by the German section of Amnesty International.

See also
First women lawyers around the world
Joel Gustave Nana Ngongang, Cameroonian LGBT activist
LGBT rights in Africa
LGBT rights in Cameroon

References

External links
Q&A with IPA Africa
Profile in The Advocate

1940s births
Living people
Cameroonian lawyers
Cameroonian LGBT rights activists
Women lawyers